Bandula de Silva Vithanage (born 11 September 1940 – died 1 September 2014 as බන්දුල විතානගේ) [Sinhala]) was an actor and director in Sri Lankan cinema, stage drama and television as well as a translator, director, playwright and scriptwriter. One of the earliest pillars of Sri Lankan art and drama, Vithanage has produced several critically acclaimed television serials and stage dramas during his five decades of drama career. He is the pioneer to introduce Shakespearean theater to Sri Lankan theater with several plays such as Veniciye Velenda, Macbeth, Twelfth Night, Hamlet and Romeo and Juliet.

He died on 1 September 2014 at Colombo National Hospital at the age of 73.

Personal life
He was born on 11 September 1940 in Gonagala. He attended Athuruwella Primary School for primary education and then moved to Carey College, Colombo to complete up to G.C.E O/L. He completed his A/L education at Dharmasoka College, Ambalangoda. He entered to the University of Colombo for higher education and came under the influence of renowned dramatist Ediriweera Sarachchandra's university drama circle. He graduated with a master's degree in Dramaturgy and Acting.

His son Nalaka Vithanage is a popular filmmaker. He has produced three stage dramas - Rathri Bojanaya (2004), Kasi Malla (2006) and Upanda Maranaya (2009). Nalaka is an old boy of Nalanda College, Colombo. Bandula Vithanage's niece Yashoda Wimaladharma is a popular actress in Sinhala television and cinema.

Career
In 1963, he started stage drama acting with P. Velikala's production Rathnavali with the role 'Vidushaka'. In 1965, he produced his first theater play Megha Garjana, which is a translation of Harold Pinter's The Collection. He acted in Simon Navagattegama's Gangavak and then directed Sapaththu Kabalak Saha Maranayak. Along with fellow dramatist Tony Ranasinghe, Vithanage produced the popular stage play Veniciye Velenda in 1980.

He continued to produce several critically acclaimed foreign drama adaptations, which include Jean Anouilh's 'Becket, Romaya Gini Gani (based on Ray Cooney's Run for your wife), Sikuru Sanekeli.Senehebara Dolly (based on Thornton Wilder's The Matchmaker), Hiru Dahasa (based on Wilder's Our Town), Macbeth (2006), Twelfth Night (1988), Hamlet, Romeo and Juliet, and A Comedy of Errors.

He acted in small number of films where compare with efforts in theater and television. He worked with and assisted Vasantha Obeysekera in Wes Gaththo, and later acted in Dharmasena Pathiraja's Ahas Gawwa. His maiden cinema acting came through 1974 film Dahakin Ekek directed by Merril Albert. His most notable television production came through Bumuthurunu, Aththa Bindei and Asal Wasiyo, which were telecast in Rupavahini. In 2011, he produced the play Romaya Gini Gani-2 as a joint effort with actor Roger Seneviratne. Romaya Gini Gani-2 was based on Cooney's play Caught in the net. He directed the television comedy serials I Love Jennie in 2007 and Paththara Gedara in 2008. In 2009, he acted in the stage play produced by his son Nalaka, Upanda Maranaya.

He joined the Rupavahini Corporation (SLRC) in its early years and had a brief serving period. He lived in England for three and a half years after the expulsion from SLRC along with Lucien Bulathsinhala.

Selected stage plays
 1963 - Rathnavali 
 1965 - Megha Garjana 
 1971 - Gangavak Sapattu Kabalak saha Maranayak 1974 - Becket 1980 - Venisiye Velenda 1982 - Dolosveni Rathriya (co-produced with Tony Ranasinghe)
 1986 - Senehebara Dolly 1990 - Hiru Dahasa 1996 - Romaya Gini Gani 1998 - Sikuru Senakeli 2001 - Macbeth 2002 - Eliya 2003 - A Sonduru Minisa 2011 - Romaya Gini Gani 2Selected television serials

 Amuthu Minissu Anthima Rathriya 
 Antharjana Minisa 
 Asal Vesiyo Asani Wesi Atta Bindei Bhavana - Akala Rathriya Bhawathra Bumu Thurunu Depath Nai Deva Daruwo 
 Devana Warama 
 Eka Iththaka Mal Heeye Manaya 
 Hiru Avarata 
 I Love Jennie Isisara Isawwa Jayathuru Sankaya Malaya Paradeesaya 
 Paththara Gedara Punchi Kumarihami Puthu Senehasa Ranga Soba 
 Rupantharaya Sudu Kapuru Pethi Three-wheel Malli 
 Urumaya Soya Vishwanthari 
 YahaluwoAuthor work
He translated several Shakespearean plays into Sinhala language.

 Hamlet 
 Veniciye Velenda Shekshpiyer Hadunaganimu Macbeth 
 Haemotama Waeradila 
 Romaya Gini Gani - 2 
 Romeo Juliet 
 Hamlet Sandeepanee 
 Sikuru Sanakeli Senehabara Dolly Jeewana Rekawa 
 Itu Pathuma 
 Gilbert, Wilbert saha Anette 
 A Sonduru MinisaDeath
He died on 1 September 2014 at Colombo National Hospital while receiving treatments. His remaining were kept at Jayaratne Funeral Parlour in Borella on 2 September and brought to National Art Gallery on 4 September. Final rites performed at 4.00 pm and buried at Borella Cemetery on the same day.

Awards and accolades
His play Sapaththu Kabalak Saha Maranayak won many awards at State Drama Festival in 1971 including Best Actress and Best Stage Designing. In 1996, the play Romaya Gini Gani won major awards including the Best Production, Best Script, Best Actor, Best Actress and Best Supporting actor at State Drama Festival. On 30 January 2011, a felicitation program was held at John de Silva Theatre to celebrate 70 years of his life.

State Drama Festival

|-
|| 1987 ||| Senehebara Dolly || Best Translation production  || 
|-
|| 1990 ||| Hiru Dahasa || Best Translation production  || 
|-
|| 1997 ||| Romaya Gini Gani'' || Best Direction and Adaptation ||

Filmography

References

External links
 SIGNIS Director Tomorrow short film festival and felicitation
 Resplendent extravaganza in Melbourne

Sri Lankan male film actors
Sinhalese male actors
1940 births
2014 deaths
Sri Lankan dramatists and playwrights
Sri Lankan novelists
Sri Lankan screenwriters
20th-century novelists
20th-century dramatists and playwrights